Ypsolopha persicella is a moth of the family Ypsolophidae. It is found in southern-eastern and central Europe, the Crimea, the Caucasus and Asia Minor.

The wingspan is 19–21 mm.

The larvae feed on Rosaceae species, including almond, apricot and peach.

External links
 Fauna Europaea

Ypsolophidae
Moths of Europe
Moths of Asia